Ape is a 2012 American independent black comedy film written and directed by Joel Potrykus, starring Joshua Burge as Trevor Newandyke. The film was a precursor to Potrykus's later film, Buzzard, which also starred Burge.

Premise
A black comedy and rage fantasy, the film follows failing stand-up comic Trevor as he suffers one humiliation after another, both on stage and off. His only outlet is a secret pyromania on display at home and in public. His anger hits the streets after making a deal with a man dressed as the Devil.

Cast
Joshua Burge as Trevor Newandyke

Release
Ape made its world premiere at the 2012 Locarno Film Festival, where it won Best New Director and Best First Feature Special Mention at the festival. It went on to make its North American premiere at the Vancouver International Film Festival, and US premiere at AFI Fest in Hollywood. The film received a theatrical release through Factory 25.

Reception
Ape has received generally favorable reviews from critics. Rotten Tomatoes gave the film a rating of 100%, based on 5 reviews.

References

External links

2012 films
American independent films
2012 independent films
Films shot in Michigan
Films directed by Joel Potrykus
2010s English-language films
2010s American films